Subedi also referred to as Suberi in Bhutan, is one of the surnames of Bramhin Varna in Nepal. They belong to the Bharadwaja Gotra. Subedi are mostly found in the hilly region of Nepal. They are also found in certain states of India like Sikkim, Assam  region of West Bengal. Significant numbers of the Subedi family are also found in the kingdom of  Bhutan and Myanmar.

Notable people with surname Subedi 

Abhi Subedi, Nepalese playwright and poet
Balkrishna, (born Balkrishna Subedi) Indian billionaire and CEO of Patanjali Ayurved 
Durga Subedi, Nepalese cricket umpire
Jhakku Prasad Subedi, Nepalese politician
Nava Raj Subedi, Nepalese politician
Purna Kumari Subedi, Nepalese politician, vice-chairperson of the Constituent Assembly of Nepal
Ram Hari Subedi, Nepalese politician, member of 2nd Constituent Assembly of Nepal
Sita Subedi, Nepalese politician
Surya Subedi, QC, DCL, OBE, British-Nepalese barrister and professor of international law

References

Nepali-language surnames
Khas surnames